Alphonce Felix Simbu (born 14 February 1992) is a Tanzanian long distance runner who specialises in the marathon. He competed in the marathon event at the 2015 World Championships in Athletics in Beijing, China. He finished 12th with a time of 2:16:58.

He competed for Tanzania at the 2016 Summer Olympics in the men's marathon. He finished 5th with a time of 2:11.15. He was the flag bearer for Tanzania during the closing ceremony.

He won the 14th edition of the Mumbai Marathon on 15 January 2017. The same year he won the bronze medal at the 2017 World Athletics Championships Marathon with a time of 2:09:51.

In 2019, he competed in the men's marathon at the 2019 World Athletics Championships held in Doha, Qatar. He finished in 16th place.

In June 2021, he qualified to represent Tanzania at the 2020 Summer Olympics where he secured 7th place with a time of 2:11:35.

He won a silver medal at the 2022 Commonwealth Games in the men's marathon event.

References

External links
 

1992 births
Living people
Tanzanian male long-distance runners
Tanzanian male marathon runners
World Athletics Championships athletes for Tanzania
Olympic athletes of Tanzania
Athletes (track and field) at the 2016 Summer Olympics
Place of birth missing (living people)
World Athletics Championships medalists
Athletes (track and field) at the 2020 Summer Olympics
Athletes (track and field) at the 2022 Commonwealth Games
Commonwealth Games silver medallists for Tanzania
Commonwealth Games medallists in athletics
20th-century Tanzanian people
21st-century Tanzanian people
Medallists at the 2022 Commonwealth Games